Lehlohonolo James Letuka is a South African politician serving as a Member of the Free State Provincial Legislature for the Democratic Alliance since May 2014. Letuka is the father of Patricia Kopane, the party's former provincial leader in the Free State.

Biography
Letuka was involved in the Black Consciousness Movement during the establishment of the South African Student Congress.

Letuka joined the Democratic Alliance and was elected to the Free State Provincial Legislature at the provincial election on 7 May 2014. The DA was accused of nepotism, since Letuka is the father of the party's provincial leader Patricia Kopane. Letuka dismissed the allegations. He was sworn in as a member of the provincial legislature (MPL) on 21 May 2014 and the party appointed him as their caucus chairperson.

In March 2016, the DA selected him as their mayoral candidate for the Mangaung Metropolitan Municipality ahead of national municipal elections. The African National Congress retained control of the municipality and Letuka remained an MPL.

Letuka was re-elected for a second term as a provincial legislature member in 2019.

References

External links

Living people
Year of birth missing (living people)
Sotho people
Democratic Alliance (South Africa) politicians
20th-century South African politicians
21st-century South African politicians
Members of the Free State Provincial Legislature